Shutman Lake (Šutmansko jezero) is one of the largest mountain lakes in the Sharr Mountains in Kosovo.

Geography 
Shutman Lake is of glacial origin and located in southern Kosovo, in the municipality of Dragaš.

Notes

References 

Lakes of Kosovo
Šar Mountains